The Odd Fellows Hall in Monticello, Iowa was built in 1871.  It is a narrow,  by  Italianate commercial building.

It was built for the Monticello Lodge No. 117 of the International Order of Odd Fellows (IOOF), that had been organized on March 16, 1858. The Odd Fellows group grew to a peak membership of 121 members, and at one point had an associated German-language lodge, William Tell #391 with 25 members, but the organization declined and was defunct by the 1920s.

It was listed in the National Register of Historic Places in 1985.  According to the 1985 nomination, it was the best-preserved Italianate, late 19th century, commercial building in Monticello.

References

Italianate architecture in Iowa
Cultural infrastructure completed in 1871
Buildings and structures in Jones County, Iowa
Odd Fellows buildings in Iowa
Clubhouses on the National Register of Historic Places in Iowa
National Register of Historic Places in Jones County, Iowa